Alan Hughes may refer to:

 Alan Hughes (cricketer) (born 1951), Irish former cricketer
 Alan Hughes (presenter) (born 1963), Irish television presenter
 Alan Hughes (footballer) (born 1948), former English footballer

See also
 Allen Hughes (1921–2009), American dance and music critic
 Allen Hughes (born 1972), of the Hughes brothers, American film directors